Chlosyne hoffmanni, or Hoffmann's checkerspot, is a butterfly of the family Nymphalidae that is found in western North America. They range from the Sierra Nevada and Cascade Mountains in the U.S. to Manning Park in British Columbia.

Description
The adult may be often confused with the northern checkerspot (C. palla and sagebrush checkerspot (C. acastus).

Life cycle
There is one flight that occurs between June to early July in Canada.  The caterpillar of this species feeds on Aster species. Adults feed on flower nectar.

Subspecies
C. h. manchada Bauer, [1960]
C. h. segregata Barnes & McDunnough, 1918

References

External links

BugGuide: Sagebrush Checkerspot (C. acastus

hoffmanni
Butterflies of North America
Taxa named by Hans Hermann Behr
Butterflies described in 1863